Slovakia first participated at the Olympic Games in 1994, and has sent athletes to compete in every Games since then.  Prior to the dissolution of Czechoslovakia in 1993, Slovak athletes competed for Czechoslovakia at the Olympics.

Slovak athletes have won a total of thirty two medals at the Summer Olympic Games, mostly in slalom canoeing. The nation has also won ten medals at the Winter Olympic Games.

The National Olympic Committee for Slovakia was created in 1992 and recognized in 1993.

Participation

Timeline of participation

Medal tables

Medals by Summer Games

Medals by Winter Games

Medals by summer sport

Medals by winter sport

List of medalists - Slovakia since 1993

Summer Games

Winter Games

Most successful Slovak competitors
Individual athletes

Teams

List of Slovak medalists – Czechoslovakia (1920–1992)

Summer Games

Winter Games

See also
 List of flag bearers for Slovakia at the Olympics
 Slovakia at the Youth Olympics
 Slovakia at the Paralympics
Slovakia at the European Youth Olympic Festival
Slovakia at the European Games
Slovakia at the Universiade
Slovakia at the World Games
 :Category:Olympic competitors for Slovakia

External links